Beresford is a civil parish in Gloucester County, New Brunswick, Canada.

For governance purposes it divided between the town of Belle-Baie, the village of Belledune, and the Chaleur rural district, all of which are members of the Chaleur Regional Service Commission.

Prior to the 2023 governance reform, the parish was divided between five municipalities and eight local service districts: the town of Beresford, New Brunswick; the villages of Belledune, Nigadoo, Petit-Rocher, and Pointe-Verte; and the LSDs of Dunlop, Laplante, Madran, Petit-Rocher-Nord (Devereaux), Petit-Rocher-Sud, Robertville, Tremblay, and the parish of Beresford, which in turn had seven named areas (often incorrectly called LSDs) receiving special services when they were created: Alcida and Dauversière; Nicholas-Denys, Free Grant and Sainte-Rosette; Petit Rocher West; Saint-Laurent Nord; Sainte-Louise; Sainte-Thérèse Sud; and Sormany. In the 2023 reform, Belledune was unaffected, while all the other municipalities were amalgamated to form Belle-Baie, which annexed all populated parts of the LSDs; the Crown land in the rear of the parish became part of the rural district. All community names remain in official use.

Origin of name
The parish was named for Baron Beresford, Commander in Chief of the Portuguese Army during the Peninsular War. Six of the parishes erected simultaneously in Northumberland County in 1814 were named for prominent British military figures.

History
Beresford was erected in 1814 from unassigned lands in the north of Northumberland County, including much of modern Restigouche County; all of the county north of the modern southern parish line of Beresford and east of the Restigouche River was included in the parish.

In 1827, all of the parish west of the Benjamin River was erected as Addington and Eldon Parishes.

In 1838, Restigouche County was erected, with the new county line beginning the same as today's but continuing in a straight line instead of turning partway along as it does now. Two years later, the Restigouche portion was erected into Colborne and Durham Parishes.

In 1881, the county line was moved to its modern position, putting the western part of interior settlements in Beresford.

Boundaries
Beresford Parish is bounded:
 on the west by the Restigouche County line;
 on the north by Chaleur Bay;
 on the east by Chaleur Bay and Nepisiguit Bay;
 on the south by the northern line of two grants on the northern side of Kent Lodge Road in Beresford and its prolongation southwesterly to the Restigouche County line.

Communities
Communities at least partly within the parish. bold indicates an incorporated municipality; italics indicate a name no longer in official use

 Alcida
 Belledune
 Hodgin
 Turgeon
 Beresford
 Dauversière
 Devereaux
 Dunlop
 Free Grant
 LaPlante
 Lincour
 Lugar
 Madran
 Massabielle
 Nicholas-Denys
 Nigadoo
 Petit-Rocher
 Petit-Rocher-Nord
 Petit-Rocher-Sud
 Pointe-Verte
 Robertville
 St. George
 Saint-Laurent
 Sainte-Louise
 Sainte-Rosette
 Sormany
 Tremblay
 Val-Michaud

Bodies of water
Bodies of water at least partly within the parish.

 Elmtree River (French Rivière aux Ormes)
 Little Elmtree River (French Petite Rivière aux Ormes)
 Millstream River
 Nigadoo River
 Tetagouche River
 Chaleur Bay
 Nepisiguit Bay
 Belledune Lake
 Lac à la Truite
 Meadow Lake
 Nigadoo Lake
 Otter Lake
 Lac à Paul

Conservation areas
Parks, historic sites, and related entities at least partly within the parish.
 Jacquet River Gorge Protected Natural Area

Demographics

Population
Parish population total does not include incorporated municipalities. Revised census figures based on the 2023 local governance reforms have not been released.

Language

Access Routes
Highways and numbered routes that run through the parish, including external routes that start or finish at the parish limits:

Highways

Principal Routes

Secondary Routes:

External Routes:
None

See also
List of parishes in New Brunswick

Notes

References

Parishes of Gloucester County, New Brunswick
Local service districts of Gloucester County, New Brunswick

fr:Beresford (Nouveau-Brunswick)